Fudbalski klub Brskovo is a football club from Mojkovac, Montenegro. Founded in 1932, they currently compete in the Montenegrin Third League.

History 
FK Brskovo was founded at 1932, as a first football team in Mojkovac. At first decade (1932–1941), the team played mostly exhibition matches, with the popular regional rivalry with FK Gorštak.
First significant success after World War II, FK Brskovo made on season 1960–61, winning the title of the Fourth League (lowest-tier competition) champion. With that result, the team gained its first-ever promotion to the Montenegrin Republic League (third level). During the sixties, FK Brskovo spent most of their seasons in the Republic League, but without significant successes.
Almost two next decades, FK Brskovo played only in the lowest rank, until the 1988–89 season. During that year, they won the champion title in the Fourth League – North, and made an comeback to the Republic League. From 1990 to 2006, FK Brskovo spent most of their seasons in the Fourth League.
Following Montenegrin independence (2006), FK Brskovo became a member of the Montenegrin Third League. They won the competition on season 2014–15, gaining first-ever promotion to the Montenegrin Second League. Until today, it remains most successful result in the history of FK Brskovo.
On their debut season in Second League, FK Brskovo had a hard struggle with FK Jezero and FK Igalo, but at the end they were relegated.
From 2011 to 2016, FK Brskovo played three finals of the Northern Region Cup, winning two titles. It gave them an opportunity to play few seasons in the Montenegrin Cup. In that competition, FK Brskovo played three times in the Round of 16, with notable games against First-League sides OFK Petrovac (0–2, 0–0; 2011–12), FK Zeta (2–1, 0–3; 2015–16) and FK Lovćen (2–4, 0–1; 2016–17).

Seasons in Montenegrin Second League
For the first and only time, FK Brskovo played in the Montenegrin Second League in the 2015–16 season.

Talent producing
During the past, FK Brskovo produced many football talents. Most known players which started their careers in FK Brskovo youth team are Stefan Savić, Dragan Bogavac and Miodrag Božović.

Honours and achievements
 Montenegrin Third League – 1
winners (1): 2014–15
 Montenegrin Fourth League – 4
winners (4): 1988–89, 1991–92, 2001–02, 2003–04
Northern Region Cup – 2
winners (2): 2011, 2016
runners-up (1): 2015

Current squad

Stadium

FK Brskovo plays their home games at Gradski stadion, on Tara riverbank. The stadium was renovated in 2009. There is one stand with capacity of 1,500 seats and additional field for trainings and youth-league games.

See also 
 Gradski stadion (Mojkovac)
 Mojkovac
 Montenegrin Third League
 Football in Montenegro
 Montenegrin clubs in Yugoslav football competitions (1946–2006)

References 

Association football clubs established in 1932
Football clubs in Montenegro
1932 establishments in Montenegro
Mojkovac